June Elvidge (June 30, 1893 – May 1, 1965) was an early 20th-century silent film actress. She was of English and Irish descent.

Biography
Born in St. Paul, Minnesota, Elvidge attended Pennsylvania College and was a concert singer before she began acting.

Elvidge debuted in Passing Show of 1914, produced by Sam Shubert at the Winter Garden Theatre in New York City. She worked there for two years. She is noted for playing roles as a vamp in silent movies such as The Lure of Woman (1915) and The Poison Pen (1919).

On Broadway, Elvidge portrayed Nina Romaine in The Girl in the Spotlight (1920).

Elvidge began working in films with the World Film stock company in 1915. Her film debut occurred in The Lure of Woman. She appeared in Westerns such as The Price of Pride (1917) and The Law of the Yukon (1920). She acted in seventy motion pictures before the beginning of the sound era. After the conclusion of her movie career in 1924, Elvidge toured America on the Orpheum Circuit, Inc., in vaudeville. She retired from show business around 1925.

Elvidge died in 1965 at the Mary Lee Nursing Home in Eatontown, New Jersey. She was 71 years old, the widow of Britton Busch, a stockbroker.

Partial filmography

The Rack (1915)
 The Price of Pride (1917)
 La Bohème (1916)
 The Almighty Dollar (1916)
 A Girl's Folly (1917)
 The Marriage Market (1917)
 The Family Honor (1917)
 The Social Leper (1917)
 The Tenth Case (1917)
 The Strong Way (1917)
 Youth (1917)
The Page Mystery (1917)
 A Square Deal (1917)
 Shall We Forgive Her? (1917)
 The Red Woman (1917)
 The Crimson Dove (1917)
 The Whip (1917)
 The Guardian (1917)
 Rasputin, The Black Monk (1917)
 Stolen Orders (1918)
 Three Green Eyes (1919)
 The Social Pirate (1919)
 Almost Married (1919)
 Fine Feathers (1921)
 Beauty's Worth (1922)
 Beyond the Rocks (1922)
 The Impossible Mrs. Bellew (1922)
 The Power of a Lie (1922)
 Quincy Adams Sawyer (1922)
 Thelma (1922)
 Forsaking All Others (1922)
 The Woman Conquers (1922)
 The Prisoner (1923)
 Temptation (1923)
 The Dancer of the Nile (1923)
 Painted People (1924)
 Pagan Passions (1924)
 The Right of the Strongest (1924)
 The Torrent (1924)
 Chalk Marks (1924)

References

External links

1925 passport photo (courtesy of the Puzzlemaster, flickr)

1893 births
1965 deaths
American film actresses
American silent film actresses
American stage actresses
People from Eatontown, New Jersey
Vaudeville performers
Actresses from Saint Paul, Minnesota
20th-century American actresses